George G. Mason House is a historic home located at Webster in Monroe County, New York. The building was constructed in 1910 and is a large -story house that combines simple Queen Anne style massing and Colonial Revival style decorative features.  The first floor is built of brick and above the house is sheathed in shingles.  Prominent exterior features include the use of bay windows, a projected stair landing on the south elevation, and paired Corinthian porch columns supported on engaged piers in the balustrade.

It was listed on the National Register of Historic Places in 2004.

References

Houses on the National Register of Historic Places in New York (state)
Queen Anne architecture in New York (state)
Neoclassical architecture in New York (state)
Houses completed in 1910
Houses in Monroe County, New York
National Register of Historic Places in Monroe County, New York
1910 establishments in New York (state)